Geikie is a surname. Notable people with the surname include:

Archibald Geikie (1835–1924), Scottish geologist and writer
Georgina Geikie (born 1984), British sport shooter
James Geikie (1839–1915), Scottish geologist
John Cunningham Geikie (1824–1906), Scottish Presbyterian minister and writer
Walter Geikie (1795–1837), Scottish painter

See also
Geikie Gorge, Western Australia
Geikie, Alberta
Geikie River (Saskatchewan)
Mount Geikie (Canada)